Gideon Harvey ( – ) was a Dutch-English physician.

Life

Education 
Gideon Harvey, born in Holland probably between 1630 and 1640, was son of John and Elizabeth Harvey, as appears by his petition for denization in 1660. According to his own account (in Casus Medico-Chirurgicus) he learned Greek and Latin in the Low Countries, and on 31 May 1655 matriculated at Exeter College, Oxford, then under the rule of the energetic Dr. Conant, where he studied philosophy. On 4 January 1657 he was entered at Leyden, where he studied medicine, anatomy, and botany, attending also the hospital practice of Professor van der Linden. At the same time, he says, he learned chemistry from a German, and received instruction from a surgeon and an apothecary in their respective arts. Apparently in the same year he passed to Paris, where he studied and attended the hospitals. He took his degrees of MB and MD while making le petit tour, probably at a small French university. He was probably very young, but his subsequent boast that he took his final degree in his seventeenth year is an obvious exaggeration.

After completing his studies in Paris he returned to Holland, and was made a fellow of the College of Physicians at the Hague. There seems to be no authority for Wood's statement that he was physician to Charles II when in exile. Harvey was in London during the Interregnum, and on 6 July 1659 was appointed by the Committee of Safety, on the motion of Desborow, to go as physician to Dunkirk. Whether he actually went there is not clear, but after the Restoration he appears as physician, or doctor-general, to the King's army in Flanders. Wearying of this employment he resigned, travelled through Germany and Italy, and afterwards settled as a physician in London. He never belonged to the College of Physicians, but at first was on good terms with that body, and spoke of it in an anonymous pamphlet published in 1670 with great respect.

Court physician 
About 1675 he was made physician to Charles II. In 1678 he was called, in consultation with other physicians, to attend a nobleman (Charles, Lord Mohun, father of the more notorious duellist), who had received a wound in a duel, of which he ultimately died. Harvey, pleading that he was commanded by the King to write an account of the case, made it the occasion of virulent personal attacks, under feigned names, on the other physicians concerned. He was already in bad odour with the profession for some rather discreditable publications on Venereal diseases, and for a book of popular medicine, which was displeasing to the apothecaries, because it revealed secrets of their trade. Five years later, in 1683, Harvey published a scurrilous attack on the College of Physicians, under the title of The Conclave of Physicians. The scene is supposed to be laid in Paris, but eminent London physicians were abused under scarcely veiled disguises. Charles II, who had a strong leaning towards irregular doctors, seems to have in some way countenanced, and perhaps enjoyed, this attack on the institution of which he was the official patron; but from a contemporary pamphlet, it appears that he was believed to have interfered in order to soften the asperity of an attack on the illustrious Willis. The pamphlet called forth an anonymous reply, besides the very poor poem Gideon's Fleece. Harvey nevertheless prospered in practice, and, though he held no court appointment under James II, was made in the first year of William and Mary "their majesties' physician of the Tower", a lucrative sinecure, which he enjoyed till his death, probably about 1700–2, and in which he was succeeded by his son, Gideon Harvey the Younger.

Critical assessment 
Harvey was a man of some education and a copious writer, but his works have no scientific value, and are disfigured by personalities as well as by undignified attempts to gain popularity. In a book on the venereal disease, for instance, he adopts the discreditable artifice of promising a secret cure, which he does not divulge, superior to those mentioned in the book. His only service to medicine was that of ridiculing certain old-world preparations, theriaca, mithridatium, and others, traditionally preserved in the London Pharmacopœia, but omitted in the next century. On the other hand, he was a determined opponent of Peruvian bark. One of his works, a collection of random criticisms on medical practice, with an ironical title, The Art of Curing Diseases by Expectation, acquired some reputation on the continent, through the patronage of a far greater man, George Ernst Stahl, who published a Latin version with long notes of his own, imbued with a kindred scepticism, and in this form it provoked some controversy. Late in life Harvey published a recantation of some of his earlier doctrines, under the title of The Vanities of Philosophy and Physick, a profession of general scepticism mingled with new hypotheses.

Harvey's works have, however, the merit of a lively and witty style, though the humour is often very rough. They reflect light on medical customs and persons of the time, and thus have some historical value. His portrait was engraved by Pierre Philippe in 1663 for his Archelogia, and appears in a smaller form by A. Hertocks in Morbus Anglicus and other works. He is represented as a handsome young man with a look of much self-sufficiency.

Works 
Harvey's writings, all issued in London, were:

 Archelogia Philosophica Nova, or New Principles of Philosophy containing Philosophy in General, Metaphysicks, &c., 4to, 1663 (with portrait).
 Discourse of the Plague, 4to, 1665; 2nd edit. 8vo, 1673, with the following:
 Morbus Anglicus, or the Anatomy of Consumptions, 8vo, 1666; 2nd edit. 1672.
 The Accomplisht Physician, the honest Apothecary, and the skilful Chyrurgeon, 4to, 1670 (anonymous, but undoubtedly Harvey's, though commonly ascribed to Christopher Merrett).
 Little Venus Unmasked, 12mo, 1671.
 Great Venus Unmasked, or a more Exact Discovery of the Venereal Evil, 8vo, 1672 (the two latter appeared in several editions with different titles).
 De Febribus Tractatus Theoreticus et Practicus, 8vo, 1672; English by J. T., 1674.
 The Disease of London, or a new Discovery of the Scorvey, 8vo, 1675.
 The Family Physician and House-apothecary, 12mo, 1676; 2nd edit. 1678.
 Casus Medico-Chirurgicus, or a most Memorable Case of a Nobleman deceased, 8vo, 1678.
 The Conclave of Physicians, also a peculiar Discourse of the Jesuit's bark, 12mo, 1683; 2nd edit. 1686.
 Discourse of the Small Pox and Malignant Fevers, with an exact Discovery of the Scorvey, 12mo, 1685.
 The Art of Curing Diseases by Expectation, 12mo, 1689; Latin, London, 1694; also edited by Stahl, Ars Sanandi cum Expectatione, Offenbach, 1730; Paris, 1730.
 Treatise of the Small Pox and Measles, 12mo, 1696.
 Particular Discourse on Opium, &c., 8vo, 1696.
 The Vanities of Philosophy and Physick, 8vo, 1699; 3rd edit. 1702.

Son 
Gideon Harvey the Younger ( – 1754), son of the elder Gideon Harvey, born apparently in London, was also a physician. He is mentioned by his father as a student at Leyden, where he entered on the philosophy line, 12 May 1688. He graduated MD of that university in 1690, with a dissertation De Febre Ardente. In 1698 he was created by royal letters Doctor of Medicine of Cambridge, as a member of Catharine Hall. He was admitted candidate of the College of Physicians of London, 3 April 1699, and fellow 22 March 1702–3, and held offices in the college. About 1700–2 he was appointed the King's physician to the Tower, as it would seem in succession to his father. He died in 1754 or the following year, being then the oldest fellow of the college. He does not appear to have published anything.

Notes

References

Bibliography 

  
 Wallis, Patrick (2004). "Harvey, Gideon (1636/7–1702)". In Oxford Dictionary of National Biography. Oxford: Oxford University Press. 
 "Gideon Harvey the Elder", National Portrait Gallery. Accessed 4 March 2022.

External links 

 Ockerbloom, John Mark, ed. "Harvey, Gideon, 1640?-1700?", The Online Books Page. Accessed 4 March 2022.

1630s births
1700s deaths
17th-century English medical doctors